Gavriel Cohen (30 May 1928 – 9 April 2021) was an Israeli academic and politician who served as a member of the Knesset for the Alignment and Labor Party between 1965 and 1969.

Biography
Born in Jerusalem during the Mandate era, Cohen joined the Palmach in 1948 and fought in the Arab-Israeli War in that year. He later studied at the Hebrew University of Jerusalem and the University of Oxford.

In 1953 he joined Ahdut HaAvoda, and in 1965 was elected to the Knesset on the Alignment list (an alliance of Ahdut HaAvoda and Mapai). He lost his seat in the 1969 elections.

Outside politics he lectured on medieval and modern history at Tel Aviv University, where he became a professor in 1976. Between 1983 and 1986 he served as dean of the Humanities Faculty at the university, before becoming a member of the Council for Higher Education.

References

External links
 

1928 births
2021 deaths
People from Jerusalem
Jews in Mandatory Palestine
Haganah members
Palmach members
Israeli soldiers
Hebrew University of Jerusalem alumni
Alumni of the University of Oxford
Israeli educators
Israeli historians
Academic staff of Tel Aviv University
Alignment (Israel) politicians
Israeli Labor Party politicians
Members of the 6th Knesset (1965–1969)